was a Japanese novelist active as one of the first post-war generation writers, and a noted influencer on Chinese literature.

His Dharma name was (恭蓮社謙誉上人泰淳和尚).

Biography
Takeda was the second son of a Buddhist priest of the Pure Land Sect, and was raised in a temple. He developed an early interest in both Chinese literature and left-wing politics and, on graduating from high school, he chose to major in Sinology at Tokyo University in 1931.  He did not complete his degree, for he withdrew from the university after being arrested for distributing leaflets critical of imperialism, which cost him a month’s imprisonment. While in prison, he became acquainted with Yoshimi Takeuchi.

Works in English
 This Outcast Generation and Luminous Moss, translated by Yusaburo Shibuya and Sanford Goldstein, Tuttle Books Tokyo 1967. 
 "The Misshapen Ones" (Igyou no Mono, 1950), translated by Edward G. Seidensticker, in

References 

1912 births
1976 deaths
20th-century Japanese novelists
Japanese sinologists
Japanese Buddhists
Shin Buddhists